The Canglang Shihua is a Chinese book of poetic criticism compiled in the Southern Song dynasty. It was written by Yan Yu, and its title, which translates as "Canglang Poetry Talks", derives from his art name, Canglang Buke (滄浪逋客).

Author and date 
The Canglang Shihua was written by Yan Yu. According to the 1268 preface written by Huang Gongshao (黄公紹), it was written in the 1230s.

Contents 
The work consists of five parts:
 Shibian (詩弁/诗弁)
 Shiti (詩體/诗体)
 Shifa (詩法/诗法)
 Shiping (詩評/诗评)
 Kaozheng (考証/考证)

This orderly layout is unique among Song poetic works.

References

Works cited

External links 
 Full text at the Chinese Text Project

Song dynasty literature
1230s books
13th-century Chinese books